Ülo Uluots (4 February 1930 Jõhvi – 18 July 1997 Tallinn) was an Estonian politician, mining engineer and military historian. From April 1992 until October 1992, Uluots was the first Estonian Minister of Defence since Estonia's regaining independence.

His father, Oskar Uluots, was an officer of the Republic of Estonia and brother of Prime Minister of Estonia Jüri Uluots.

He was a member of VIII Riigikogu.

References

1930 births
1997 deaths
20th-century Estonian historians
Estonian engineers
Estonian Coalition Party politicians
Members of the Riigikogu, 1995–1999
Defence Ministers of Estonia
Voters of the Estonian restoration of Independence
Tallinn University of Technology alumni
People from Jõhvi